Harry Robinson (born 27 December 1969 from Eden, Cumbria) is a former English professional darts player. Who currently playing in the Professional Darts Corporation tournaments. He used to play rugby union, before switching to darts.

Career
From Eden, Cumbria, Robinson originally started his sporting career playing rugby union, before switching to darts in 1990, reaching the final of the BDO German Open that year.

After switching to the PDC, he played in the 1997 World Matchplay, losing to Mick Manning in the first round. His big breakthrough came in the 1998 PDC World Darts Championship, when he won Group 8. After losing to the American Steve Brown in his first match, he needed a big win against 3rd seed Alan Warriner to qualify for the quarter-finals, and thanks to whitewashing him 3–0, he topped the group by set difference. He would go on to lose 4–1 to Keith Deller in the quarter-finals. He beating with Sean Downs in the first round and lose Alan Warriner-Little in the Last 16 2–3.

After doing nothing of note for the majority of the following 20 years, Robinson won a PDC Tour Card at Q-School in 2016.

Robinson quit the PDC in 2018.

World Championship Performances

PDC
 1998: Quarter Final (lost to Keith Deller 1–4)
 1999: Second round (lost to Alan Warriner 2–3)

References

External links

1969 births
Living people
People from Eden District
Sportspeople from Cumbria
English rugby union players
English darts players
Professional Darts Corporation former tour card holders
Rugby union players from Cumbria